Perideridia americana is a species of flowering plant in the family Apiaceae known by the common names eastern yampah and wild dill. It has been found in 12 Midwestern United States, and is listed as threatened or endangered in at least 3 of them.  In Missouri it is a conservation species of concern.

Wild dill grows in calcareous soils in many habitat types, including glades, upland prairies, and forests. It is a perennial herb whose upright stems are between 50 and 120 centimeters tall, with sparse alternate doubly pinnate leaves ending in long tapering leaflets. The inflorescence is a compound umbel of many spherical clusters of small white flowers. The fruits are 3-5 millimeters long with 5 slender ribs.

The life cycle of this species was described in a 1993 paper.

References

External links
USDA Plants Profile
Illinois Wildflowers

americana
Nature conservation in the United States
Flora of the United States
Plants described in 1829